Truxa is a 1937 German drama film directed by Hans H. Zerlett and starring La Jana, Hannes Stelzer, and Ernst Fritz Fürbringer. It is a Circus film, based on a novel by Heinrich Seiler. The film was released in the United States and was one of the most successful German films show in America that year.

It was remade in Britain the following year as Star of the Circus.

Partial cast

References

Bibliography

External links 
 

1937 films
1930s thriller films
German thriller films
1930s German-language films
Films directed by Hans H. Zerlett
Films based on German novels
Circus films
Films about magic and magicians
German black-and-white films
Tobis Film films
1930s German films